The Balochistan National Party or Balochistan National Party (Mengal) (Urdu: بلوچستان نيشنل پارٹی) is a political party in Balochistan, Pakistan. BNP believes in more provincial rights and greater autonomy for Baluchistan province through peaceful and democratic struggle.

History 
In 1972, the National Awami Party or NAP formed the first elected government in Balochistan after winning the elections and Ataullah Mengal was sworn in as the first Chief Minister of Balochistan. But just nine months after the formation of the NAP Government, it was overthrown by Bhutto who used Nawab Akbar Bugti's allegation that Mengal's regime wanted to disintegrate Pakistan and liberate Balochistan as grounds for this dismissal. Ataullah Mengal, Ghaus Bakhsh Bizenjo, Gul Khan Nasir, Nawab Khair Bux Marri and the other NAP leaders were thrown in jail. They were released when Bhutto's government was toppled by Zia-ul-Haq, after spending more than four years in captivity. By this time differences had arisen between the NAP leadership, so while Mengal, Bizenjo and Nasir went to the NAP headquarters, Khair Bux and Shero Marri headed home.

Later, Ghaus Bakhsh Bizenjo formed the Pakistan National Party or PNP after differences arose between him and Wali Khan over the Kabul Revolution (he supported the revolution while Wali Khan was against it). Gul Khan joined PNP and became the President of its Balochistan wing while Ataullah went into exile in London.

In 1996, Ataullah Mengal returned to Pakistan and formed the Balochistan National Party.

BNP Government 
BNP swept the 1997 elections and was able to form a coalition government in Balochistan with Sardar Ataullah Mengal's son, Akhtar Mengal as the Chief Minister. This government did not last long, as differences began arising between the Balochistan Provincial Government and the Federal Government.

1998–2009 
After the dismissal of their first government, BNP hasn't taken part in any elections. In 2002, the party didn't compete in the elections in protest of General Pervez Musharraf's October 1999 military coup which allowed the pro-military religious alliance to win almost all the moderate and nationalist constituencies. Though a few members of the party did take part in the elections independently. One of these members got elected to the National Assembly of Pakistan, one to the Senate of Pakistan and two to the Provincial Assembly i.e. Mir Akbar Mengal and Mir Akhtar Hussain Langove.

In 2006, Nawab Akbar Bugti was killed by the Pakistani Army. BNP had vehemently criticized the government when the operation in Balochistan had been launched and after Bugti's death all four of its independently elected representatives resigned from their seats of the National and Provincial Assemblies.

In December 2006 Akhtar Mengal was arrested for allegedly ordering his security guards to beat up secret service personnel. Mengal maintained that these secret service officials had tried to kidnap his children as they returned from school and as a result, the security guards had beaten them. During his trial, according to Mr Iqbal Haider, secretary-general of the Human Rights Commission of Pakistan, "Mr Mengal was brought into the courtroom and shoved into an iron cage with bars all around that stood in a corner away from his counsel.” Mengal was released in 2008, after the Pakistan Peoples Party government came in power, after spending almost one and a half year in jail.

After Akhtar Mengal's arrest, the rest of the BNP leadership was also imprisoned mainly in MPO cases. On December 2, Sajid Tareen was arrested from his chambers, Habib Jalib Baloch, Mir Akhtar Hussain Langove and Akbar Mengal were also arrested the same day. Jahanzeb Jamaldini was also put under arrest in December. Then, on January 3, 2007 the acting Chief of BNP, Mir Noor-ud-din Mengal was also arrested along with other activists while they were on their way to meet imprisoned workers of BNP in Khuzdar.

Platform 
The Balochistan National Party's main goal has been for the provinces having control over their resources. Under the 1973 Constitution of Pakistan, the federal government has broad powers, though the Eighteenth Amendment to the Constitution of Pakistan brought some changes.

Council Session 2009 
Balochistan National Party's third council session was held between 25 and 28 June 2009. It was presided over by an ailment stricken Akhtar Mengal. In this council session the leadership and central committee members of the party were selected as follows:

Leadership 
 Sardar Akhtar Jan Mengal (President)
 Jahanzeb Jamaldeni (Senior Vice President)
 Sajid Tareen (Vice President)
 Jahanzeb Baloch (Deputy General Secretary)
 Mir Akhtar Hussain Langov (Joint Secretary)
 Agha Hassan Baloch (Information Secreatory & Culture Sec.)
 Hammal Baloch (Finance Secretary)
 Malik Naseer Shahwani (Secretary of Agriculture and Fisheries)
 Jameela Baloch (Women Secretary)

Central Committee members 
 Mir Akhtar Hussain Langove
 Mir Mohammad Aslam Kurd
 Syed Nabeel Zaidi
 Mir Abdullah Jan
 Mir Akram Siapad
 Mir Haji Abid Hussain
 Sanaullah Baloch
 Sardar Haq Nawaz Buzdar
 Mir Yaqoob Bizenjo
 Abdul Ghafoor Mengal
 Abdul Hameed Khetran
 Abdul Raoof Mengal
 Adv. Abdul Hameed
 Attaullah Mengal (-2021)
 Chairman Manzoor Baloch
 Dr Abdul Ghafoor
 Dr. Abdul Qudus
 Dr. Abdul Samad Mirwani
 Eng. Malik Mohammad Sasoli
 Agha Musa Jan
 Arbab Mohammad Naeem Dehwar
 Ghulam Nabi Marri
 Ghullam Haider Kaka Buzdar
 Hameed Sajna
 Laal Jan Baloch
 Malik Abdul Hameed kakar
 Mohammad Yonus
 Mohammad Qasim Roonjho
 Murad Jan
 Latif Baloch
 Nawabzada Mir Amanullah
 RG Khosa
 Mir Juma Kubdani

Ladies Central Committee 
 Khalida Mengal
 Rashida Mengal
 Sania Hassan Kashani
 Yasmeen Baloch

See also 
 Gul Khan Nasir
 Ataullah Mengal
 Akhtar Mengal
 National Awami Party (Wali)
 Ghaus Bakhsh Bizenjo
 Akbar Bugti
 Yaqoob Bizanjo
 Balochistan National Party Awami

References

Further reading

External links 

 
Baloch nationalist organizations
Socialist parties in Pakistan
Democratic socialist parties in Asia
Members of the Unrepresented Nations and Peoples Organization
1996 establishments in Pakistan
Political parties established in 1996
Political parties in Pakistan